Al-Qutayfah is a city in Syria, administratively belonging to the Rif Dimashq Governorate, capital of the al-Qutayfah District. According to the Syria Central Bureau of Statistics (CBS), al-Qutayfah had a population of 26,671 in the 2004 census. Its inhabitants are predominantly Sunni Muslims.

References

Bibliography

Populated places in Al-Qutayfah District
Cities in Syria